Canistropsis exigua is a species of flowering plant in the genus Canistropsis.

This bromeliad is endemic to the Atlantic Forest biome (Mata Atlantica Brasileira) within São Paulo (state), located in southeastern Brazil.

References

exigua
Endemic flora of Brazil
Flora of São Paulo (state)
Flora of the Atlantic Forest